The United States Postal Regulatory Commission (or PRC), formerly called the Postal Rate Commission, is an independent regulatory agency created by the Postal Reorganization Act of 1970. Like the Postal Service, it was defined in law as an independent establishment of the executive branch.

History

Postal Rate Commission
The Postal Reorganization Act of 1970 created the PRC—originally named the Postal Rate Commission—to set the rates for different classes of mail by holding hearings on rates proposed by the United States Postal Service (USPS).

From 1970 through 2006, the PRC also had oversight authority over the USPS in areas besides rates changes. Specifically, that additional oversight consisted of conducting public, on-the-record hearings concerning proposed mail classification or major service changes and of recommending actions to be taken by the postal Governors.

Postal Regulatory Commission
The Postal Accountability and Enhancement Act of 2006 (Public Law 109-435) enacted on December 20, 2006, made several changes to the Postal Regulatory Commission. Besides giving the body its current name, the Postal Accountability and Enhancement Act significantly strengthened the Commission's authority to serve as a counterbalance to new flexibility granted to the USPS in setting postal rates.

The Postal Accountability and Enhancement Act requires the Postal Regulatory Commission to develop and maintain regulations for a modern system of rate regulation, consult with the Postal Service on delivery service standards and performance measures, consult with the Department of State on international postal policies, prevent cross-subsidization or other anti-competitive postal practices, promote transparency and accountability, and adjudicate complaints.

The law also assigns new and continuing oversight responsibilities to the Postal Regulatory Commission, including annual determinations of USPS compliance with applicable laws, development of accounting practices and procedures for the Postal Service, review of the Universal Service requirement, and assurance of transparency through periodic reports. New enforcement tools given to the PRC include subpoena power, authority to direct the Postal Service to adjust rates and to take other remedial actions, and levying fines in cases of deliberate noncompliance with applicable postal laws.

Retiree Health Benefits Fund
According to the Postal Accountability and Enhancement Act, the United States Postal Service must make annual payments of between $5.4 billion and $5.8 billion to the Postal Service Retiree Health Benefits Fund from 2007. This provision of the law has been highly controversial, as no other federal agency is required to pre-fund future retirees' health benefits in this manner. The consequences of this funding requirement have been blamed for the perilous financial condition of the Postal Service, but no consensus has been reached on its fiscal effects, given other contributors such as stiff competition and other economic circumstances. 

In June 2011, the United States Postal Service had to suspend its weekly payment of $115 million into the fund because it had reached $8 billion in debt and the retirement plan had a surplus of $6.9 billion.

Composition
The PRC is composed of five Commissioners—each of whom is appointed to a six-year term of office by the President and confirmed by the Senate, similar to many other high-level Executive Branch office holders. As with Postal Governors, PRC commissioners are permitted to serve for one additional "holdover" year beyond the end of their term if a replacement has not been nominated and confirmed. The President designates one Commissioner as Chairman of the Commission. The Commissioners together designate one of their number as a Vice-Chairman for a one-year term. No more than three of the Commissioners can be from any one political party.

The current members are:

Taub and Acton were confirmed for second terms in December 2016. Fisher and Poling were confirmed as new Commissioners on August 1, 2019. Kubayanda was confirmed for a second term in December 2021.

The PRC is organized into five operating offices: Accountability and Compliance, General Counsel, Public Affairs and Government Relations, Secretary, and Inspector General.

Past commissioners and chairmen

Office of Accountability & Compliance
The Office of Accountability & Compliance (OAC) provides analytic support to the Commission for the review of various Postal Service proposed actions: rate changes, negotiated service agreements (NSAs), classification of products and services, the Annual Compliance Determination, the Annual Report to President and Congress, changes to postal services, post office closings and other issues before the Commission. Areas of expertise include economic and econometric analysis, analysis of operational characteristics of the postal system, analysis of Postal Service operating costs and cost methodologies. OAC also collects, analyzes and periodically summarizes financial and various other statistical information to support Commission responsibilities.

Office of General Counsel
The Office of General Counsel provides legal assistance on matters involving the Commission's responsibilities; defends Commission decisions before the courts; and advises the Commission on the legal aspects of proposed legislation, rulemaking, and policies on procurement, contracting, personnel matters, ethics, and other internal legal matters.

Office of Public Affairs & Government Relations
The Office of Public Affairs & Government Relations (PAGR) manages communications and public outreach for the Commission with the public, Members of Congress, the Postal Service, state and local governments, and the news media. PAGR engages in public outreach, responds to media inquiries and disseminates information concerning Commission decisions and activities to the public. PAGR also provides information to postal customers and assists in the resolution of informal complaints, called "rate and service inquiries", from members of the public.

Office of Secretary & Administration
The Office of Secretary & Administration records and preserves PRC actions and documents, manages the dockets, reference materials, and interagency reporting. It also helps to manage the administrative aspects of the PRC, including budgeting and accounting, strategic planning, contracting, human resources and personnel, and serves as a point of contact for audits. It also manages facilities and infrastructure, and provides support services.

Office of Inspector General
The Office of Inspector General is a watchdog office that seeks out fraud, waste and abuse in the PRC programs and operations, and conducts audits of programs to identify areas of potential improvement. The Office of Inspector General also investigates allegations and complaints.

Public Representative
The law (39 U.S.C. 505) requires that the Commission designate an individual to represent the interest of the general public in every public proceeding. This obligation is likely unique in the federal government, although state-level public utility commissions have similar arrangements. Since 2007, the Commission has used the method of appointing a staff member, on a case-by-case basis, to represent the public interest before the Commission for the duration of that particular case. This appointee is called the Public Representative. The Public Representative can obtain legal or technical support if necessary to fulfill that responsibility, but no one working in the Public Representative role can participate in the Commission's decision-making process.

See also
 Board of Governors of the United States Postal Service
 History of United States postage rates

Notes

External links 
 
  Postal Accountability and Enhancement Act of 2006
 Postal Regulatory Commission in the Federal Register

Independent agencies of the United States government
United States Postal Service
Government agencies established in 1970
Postage rates